Developed in the late 1980s by the Ford Motor Company, the Ford Zeta engine was a straight-4, double overhead cam internal combustion engine with which Ford had intended to replace the analogous Pinto and CVH models.

Ford designed the Zeta to share some parts with other Ford engine developments at the time, including the smaller Sigma I-4 and larger Duratec V6. 
This engine shares its bore and stroke dimensions with the 2-valve CVH engine. Ford Power Products sells the Zeta in 1.8 L and 2.0 L versions as the MVH.

Production of the engines, renamed Zetec (the rename occurred because Lancia owned the "Zeta" trademark), began at Ford's Bridgend plant in Wales in September 1991, with later production added at Cologne, Germany in 1992 and Chihuahua, Chihuahua, Mexico, in 1993. The first Zetecs displaced 1.8 L, with a 2.0 L version arriving quickly afterwards. The final Zeta Zetec was produced on December 10, 2004 at the Bridgend factory with over 3,500,000 built at that location.

The engine fits the Ford T9, B5/iB5, G5M/G25MR, CD4E and MTX-75 gearboxes using the same bell bolt pattern as the Crossflow.

Phases of Production

Overview of applications

 1992-05/1998 - Ford Mondeo 1.6 90 bhp (Engine codes: L1F, L1J)
 05/1998-2001 - Ford Mondeo 1.6 88 bhp (Engine codes: L1N, L1Q)
 Ford Fiesta 1992–1995 (1.6 90 bhp Si) (1.8 105 bhp S/XR2i 16V) (1.8 130 bhp RS1800)
 Ford Escort 1992–1998 (Europe) (1.6 90 bhp Si) (1.8 105/130 bhp XR3i) (1.8 115 bhp Si/GTi)
 1995–2000 Ford Contour and Mercury Mystique
 1999–2002 Mercury Cougar
 2000–2003 Ford Escape and Mazda Tribute
 2000–2003 Ford Focus
 1998-2003 Ford Escort ZX2.
 Formula Ford 2000 series (2003 – present)

2.0 
The 2.0 L Zetec shared its  bore and  stroke with its predecessor, the 2.0 L 2-valve CVH.  On top of the 16 Valve DOHC head, the Zetec for the US Market Escort ZX2, Contour, and Cougar gained Variable Valve Timing on the Exhaust Cam, removing its requirement of EGR for US Emissions.

A high 10.2:1 compression ratio and larger valves contributed to the SVT version's much-higher output; while a special ECU tune that modified the Variable Valve Timing, among other settings, contributed to the 10% power increase on the ZX2 S/R.

Applications:
 1998-2003 Ford Escort (North America) ZX2, 130 hp (97 kW) and 127 lb·ft (172 Nm)
 1999-2000 Ford Escort ZX2 S/R, 143 hp (107 kW) and 146 lb·ft (198 Nm)
 2000-2004 Ford Focus, 128 hp (97 kW) and 135 lb·ft (183 Nm)
 2002-2004 SVT Focus, 170 hp (127 kW) and 145 lb·ft (197 Nm)
 1995-2000 Ford Contour
 1995-2000 Mercury Mystique
 2001-2005 Ford Escape
 2001-2005 Mazda Tribute

Turbo 

See also
 Ford Zetec engine

References

External links

 Staff writer. "Ford Bridgend says farewell to the Zetec engine and hello to the Zetec SE." carpages.co.uk

Zeta
Gasoline engines by model
Straight-four engines